Gymnobathra caliginosa is a moth of the family Oecophoridae. It was described by Philpott in 1927. It is found in New Zealand.

References

 Gymnobathra caliginosa in species-id

Moths described in 1927
Oecophoridae